The Burnt Orange Heresy is a 2019 crime thriller film directed by Giuseppe Capotondi and with a screenplay by Scott Smith. The film is based on the book of the same name by Charles Willeford and stars Claes Bang, Elizabeth Debicki, Mick Jagger, and Donald Sutherland.

The Burnt Orange Heresy was selected as the closing film at the 76th Venice International Film Festival and was released on March 6, 2020, by Sony Pictures Classics.

Synopsis
Art critic James Figueras is enlisted by a wealthy art dealer to steal a painting from reclusive painter Jerome Debney.

Cast 

 Claes Bang as James Figueras
 Elizabeth Debicki as Berenice Hollis
 Mick Jagger as Joseph Cassidy
 Donald Sutherland as Jerome Debney
 Rosalind Halstead as Evelina Macri
 Alessandro Fabrizi as Rodolfo

Production 
In February 2018, Elizabeth Debicki and Christopher Walken were cast in the film adaptation of Charles Willeford's book The Burnt Orange Heresy, to play Berenice Hollis and artist Jerome Debney, respectively. In April 2018, Claes Bang joined the film to play the lead role of James Figueras, a fiercely ambitious art critic and thief. In early September 2018, Mick Jagger was cast to play Joseph Cassidy, an art dealer. In late September 2018, Donald Sutherland was cast in the film, replacing Walken, to play an enigmatic painter who becomes the target of an art-world heist.

Principal photography on the film began late September 2018 in Lake Como, Italy.

Release 
The film had its world premiere at the Venice International Film Festival on September 7, 2019. Shortly after, Sony Pictures Classics acquired distribution rights to the film. It was released on March 6, 2020. Following the closure of theaters a week later due to the COVID-19 pandemic, Sony Pictures Classics opted to hold the film for when theaters re-open instead of putting the film on digital platforms. It was re-released on August 7, 2020.

Critical reception
The website's critics consensus reads, "The Burnt Orange Heresy has a certain stylish charm, even if -- much like the art world it depicts -- it'll strike some viewers as pretentious." On Metacritic, the film holds a rating of 57 out of 100, based on reviews from 26 critics, indicating "mixed or average reviews".

The Boston Herald notes that the artist adds the image of a fly to each of his paintings, "a metaphor for sin and evil"; the image recurs throughout "this dark fable".

References

External links 
 
 
 

2019 films
2019 crime drama films
2019 crime thriller films
2019 thriller drama films
2010s heist films
American crime drama films
American crime thriller films
American thriller drama films
American heist films
English-language Italian films
Italian crime drama films
Italian crime thriller films
Italian thriller drama films
Italian heist films
Films shot in Italy
Films based on mystery novels
Films based on American novels
HanWay Films films
Sony Pictures Classics films
Works by Scott Smith
2010s English-language films
2010s American films